Daniël Sahuleka (born 6 December 1950) is an Indonesian-Dutch singer-songwriter and performing artist.

Sahuleka created more than 110 compositions. Daniel owns all copyright of his songs. Many of his songs have become evergreen hits, such as "You Make My World So Colourful" from the album Daniel Sahuleka (1977) and "Don't Sleep Away the Night" (1980).

In the early 1980s, Daniel's hits were "Wake Up" and "We'll Go Out Tonight". In 1993 Daniel's new hit was "I Adore You" and in 2007 he got a new hit with the song "If I Didn't". In  2009 he re-made new recordings of "You Make My World So Colourful" and "Don't Sleep Away" for his album "reMAKE mySTYLE" (iTUNES and physical album). In 1982 Daniel Sahuleka was greatly admired in Europe as vocalist of the song "Giddyap a Gogo", composed by Ad Visser, and the single reached the Dutch Top 40.
 
In Indonesia, Los Angeles and Europe, Sahuleka has received many prestigious awards. Also he was invited at many jazz festivals (Jakarta International Java Jazz Festival, Makassar International Festival, Kota Tua Creative Festival, etc.).

Personal life
He was born in 1950 in Semarang, Central Java, Indonesia. Daniel had an Ambonese father, Simon Pieter Sahuleka (born 1919 in Saparua, Maluku) and a mixed Chinese-Sundanese mother, Juarsi Mohanab (born 1924 in Pontianak, West Kalimantan).

Discography

Albums
 1977: Sahuleka 1
 1978: Sahuleka 2
 1981: Sunbeam
 1981: We'll Go Out Tonight with Daniel Sahuleka
 1990: The Loner
 1993: I Adore You
 1995: RahASIA
 1998: After the Jetlag
 2003: Colorfool
 2006: If I Didn't
 2007: Christmas Love
 2008: Eastern Journeys
 2009: reMAKE mySTYLE
 2010: Book "Daniel and his Songs" (in Bahasa Indonesia)
 2011: reMAKE mySTYLE (in Indonesia and Singapore)
 2015:  " Dad's Request " Indonesia and on I Tunes Worldwide

Singles
 1976: "You Make My World So Colourful"
 1976: "Marie Claire"
 1977: "Love to Love You"
 1977: "The Change"
 1978: "Long Distance Highway"
 1979: "Finally Home Again"
 1980: "Don't Sleep Away the Night"
 1981: "We'll Go Out Tonight"
 1981: "Wake Up"
 1982: "Ev'rybody Feel the Groove"
 1982: "Viva La Libertad"
 1983: "Ev'ry Day"
 1983: "Such Luck"
 1983: "Skankin'
 1984: "Dance in the Street"
 1985: "Let Us All Be One"
 1990: "Imagine"
 1993: "You Make My World So Colourful" (live)
 1995: "Bulan Pakai Payung"
 1995: "Simphoni"
 1996: "Dust of Life"
 1998: "How Nice"
 1998: "How I Love"
 1998: "How Love"

RBT 
 2018: "Don't Sleep Away the Night"
 2018: "If I Didn't"
 2018: "The Rain"
 2018: "You Make My World So Colourful"
 2018: "I Adore You"
 2018: "If I Didn't"

References

External links
 

1950 births
Living people
Indo people
20th-century Indonesian male singers
Dutch singer-songwriters
Indonesian emigrants to the Netherlands
Naturalised citizens of the Netherlands
People from Semarang
21st-century Dutch male singers
21st-century Dutch singers